"Don't Say Good-Bye" is the first in the five-single series of indies collaboration singles by Japanese girl group Melon Kinenbi, in a collaboration with Beat Crusaders. It was released as limited distribution on June 24, 2009. People that purchased the single from the Tower Records online store received a free original computer wallpaper. The single peaked at #68 on the Oricon weekly charts, and charted for one week.

Track listing
"Don't Say Good-Bye"
"Don't Say Good-Bye" (Instrumental)

References

2009 singles
2009 songs